Leipzig/Halle Airport  (German: Flughafen Leipzig/Halle) is an international airport located in Schkeuditz, Saxony, Germany, and serves both Leipzig, Saxony, and Halle, Saxony-Anhalt.

It is Germany's 14th largest airport by passengers and handled more than 2.61 million passengers in 2019 mainly with flights to European leisure destinations. In terms of cargo traffic, the airport is the fifth-busiest in Europe and the second-busiest in Germany after Frankfurt Airport, having handled 1,238,343 metric tonnes of cargo in 2019. The airport serves as the main European hub for DHL Aviation and the main hub for AeroLogic. Military installations have also been built at the airport for NATO and EU military aircraft.

History

The airport was built new from the ground up at a location between Halle and Leipzig from 1926 and opened in 1927.

On 18 March 1986, Air France flew a Concorde to the airport, to coincide with the world-renowned Leipzig trade fair. Two days later British Airways also flew a Concorde to Leipzig/Halle. In the following years, both airlines operated Concorde flights from Paris and London when the trade fair was held in Leipzig.

Despite its name, the airport is located in the town of Schkeuditz, Nordsachsen. A deal between the city of Leipzig and the Landkreis Delitzsch led to a land exchange. In 2007, Leipzig received land outside the airport while ownership of the airport land was transferred to Delitzsch. The District of Delitzsch, which by now has merged to become part of Landkreis Nordsachsen, owns and claims taxes from the grounds and commercial interest from the airport.

DHL Aviation moved its European hub from Brussels Airport to Leipzig/Halle in early 2008, leading to a significant increase in cargo traffic at the airport. Leipzig bid to host the 2012 Olympic Games and the airport was modernised as a result, even though London was eventually awarded the games.

In spring 2013, Ryanair announced the start of operations to Leipzig/Halle on six routes. However, one year later all of them except the flights to London–Stansted were terminated. In February 2015, Etihad Regional announced the immediate termination of all their Leipzig/Halle operations which had started only two years earlier, due to changes to their operational concept. All three routes were shut down while two newly announced ones did not start.

In September 2016, Pakistan International Airlines announced plans to replace Manchester on their Islamabad - Manchester - New York City route with Leipzig/Halle in 2017 due to lower operational costs and time-saving measures. As the airline holds Fifth Freedom rights, this would be Leipzig/Halle's first passenger service to the United States. In October 2017 the airline announced it would end of all routes to the United States, so plans to use Leipzig as a layover to New York-JFK never came to be.

In October 2016, DHL inaugurated a major expansion to its freight facilities at the airport. Two new cargo terminals increased handling capacity by 50 percent.

As of April 2018, the largest passenger airline at Leipzig/Halle Airport (measured by weekly departures) is Condor with 55 outgoing flights per week. For this purpose, three Airbus A321 aircraft are stationed at the airport. The second-largest airline was Small Planet Airlines (Germany) with 18 outgoing flights per week. The airline stationed an Airbus A320 aircraft to serve several leisure destinations for TUI Group. It was followed by SunExpress Deutschland which operated 15 weekly departures and stationed for this a Boeing 737 aircraft at the airport.

In August 2018, DHL announced further expansion of its facilities at the airport. Beside an enlargement of the apron, a new pilot training center was also planned. The number of employees was to increase from 5700 to 6000. At the same time, EAT Leipzig announced that they would add five used Airbus A330 freighters to their fleet, for a total of 36 aircraft. Also in August 2018, the Russian Volga-Dnepr Group announced plans to launch a new German freight subsidiary based at the airport.

Facilities

Terminal
The modern airport terminal structure extends over the adjacent motorway and railway. It integrates the main car park as well as the check-in-facilities and is connected to a pier equipped with six jet bridges as well as several apron stands. Due to its compact design, it provides short walking distances. The airport terminal has immigration facilities for international flights but no international transfer area.

Runways
The airport has two runways. Terminal access is south of the railway.  Runway 08L/26R runs parallel to the road north of the railway, requiring aircraft to taxi on a bridge over the tracks and roads.

Airlines and destinations

Passenger
The following airlines operate regular scheduled and charter flights at Leipzig/Halle Airport:

Cargo

Military
Some US airlines fly to Leipzig/Halle on behalf of the US Department of Defense, to bring US Army troops and US Marines to Afghanistan and Iraq. Leipzig/Halle is used as a technical stop for refueling on these flights. They do not appear at any official timetable. Marines and soldiers flown via Leipzig/Halle are listed as transit passengers in its traffic statistics. Military charter flights are also operated via Leipzig/Halle.

Statistics

Ground transportation

Train

Leipzig/Halle Airport railway station is located directly beneath the passenger terminal and has Intercity connections on the Dresden-Magdeburg-Hanover-Cologne route. Two lines of the suburban S-Bahn Mitteldeutschland connect directly to Leipzig and Halle, furthermore to Altenburg and Zwickau. Transit connection of the network reach most of parts of Central Germany.

Car
The airport is connected to two motorways: the A14 connecting to Dresden (130 km), Halle (Saale, 20 km) and Magdeburg (130 km), and the A9 connecting to Munich (430 km), Nuremberg (280 km), and Berlin (180 km).

Coach
Flixbus connects in both ways twice per day to Dresden, Göttingen, and Kassel and once per day to Dortmund and Cologne.

In popular culture
The airport's facilities have been featured in major films and TV shows during recent years:

 In December 2004, Leipzig/Halle Airport was a filming location for Flightplan starring Jodie Foster and Peter Sarsgaard. According to the film, Jodie Foster's flight departs from Berlin but all shots showing Berlin's supposed airport were actually taken at Leipzig/Halle Airport.
 In 2010, the check-in area of Leipzig/Halle was a filming location for Unknown starring Liam Neeson and Diane Kruger.
 The airport's terminal and apron were featured heavily in the Marvel Cinematic Universe's live-action film Captain America: Civil War (2016). Branded equipment featuring the airport's logo was shown several times during the scenes.
 The airport's hallway between the check-in area and the public departure/arrival area was featured in the Netflix series Inventing Anna, which tells the story of Anna Sorokin. In the series, an American journalist flies to Berlin to conduct research on Anna's upbringing for her next article but all airport scenes were shot at Leipzig/Halle Airport.

Accidents and incidents
On September 1, 1975, Interflug Flight 1107 crashed on approach to the airport when the Tupolev TU-134 descended too quickly, not following the proper approach path, while the crew failed to monitor their altitude, leading to a CFIT. 27 of the 34 people on board perished.

See also
 Transport in Germany
 List of airports in Germany
 Kursdorf, a ghost village located between the airport's runways

References

External links

 Official website
 
 

Airports in Saxony
Airport
Airport
Airport
Nordsachsen
Schkeuditz